Martin Jarvis OBE (born 4 August 1941) is an English actor and a producer of radio drama. Described by the BBC as "one of Britain's most distinguished and versatile actors", he has had a varied career in theatre, film and television, and is particularly noted for radio acting and voicing audiobooks.

Early life
Jarvis was born in Cheltenham, Gloucestershire, to Denys Harry Jarvis and Margot Lillian Scottney, and grew up in South Norwood and Sanderstead.

He was educated at Whitgift School, an independent school in Croydon, and at the Royal Academy of Dramatic Art (RADA), where he won the Vanbrugh Award and the silver medal.

Theatre work
Jarvis has acted in many stage productions in London and abroad, including alongside Diana Rigg and Natascha McElhone in Joanna Murray-Smith's Honour at London's Wyndham's Theatre in 2006. His other stage work includes Woman in Mind and Henceforward... by Alan Ayckbourn, Other Places by Harold Pinter, Exchange by Michael Frayn, and The Importance of Being Earnest by Oscar Wilde (opposite Judi Dench).

Jarvis appeared on Broadway in 2001 as P. G. Wodehouse's character Jeeves in the musical By Jeeves, a performance for which he was awarded a Theatre World Award.

Radio work
Jarvis has had a long association with the BBC, particularly BBC Radio 4. In the 1980s Michael Frayn's columns for The Guardian and The Observer, described by some as models of the comic essay, were adapted and performed in many voices for BBC Radio 4 by Jarvis. He read a four part adaptation of John Gordon (author)'s The Giant Under the Snow in 1981. He performs regularly in radio dramas and readings, both comic and serious. In David Mamet's Mind Your Pantheon he played the actor Strabo. He is known for his long series of readings of Richmal Crompton's Just William stories, which show his characteristic and flexible reading voices. He has also narrated the Billy Bunter series by Frank Richards. As a result of this extensive work, Jarvis has been satirised in the radio show Dead Ringers by Mark Perry, highlighting his seeming ubiquity in Radio 4 programmes.

Jarvis has performed the role of Jeeves in multiple radio dramas based on P. G. Wodehouse's Jeeves stories, including the 1997 L.A. Theatre Works adaptation of The Code of the Woosters, the 2014 BBC radio adaptation of Ring for Jeeves, and the 2018 BBC radio adaptation of Stiff Upper Lip, Jeeves. He performs live dramatic readings of some of the stories in the intermittent radio series Jeeves Live! (2007–2020).

In America, Jarvis and his wife Rosalind Ayres perform frequently in audio drama with the L.A. Theater Works and Hollywood Theater of the Ear.

In 2011, he appeared in a Radio 4 production of Terence Rattigan's In Praise of Love.

Television work
Jarvis's first television appearance was in the BBC science fiction series Doctor Who as Hilio, captain of the  butterfly-like Menoptra, in The Web Planet (1965). He returned to Doctor Who as the scientist Dr. Butler in Invasion of the Dinosaurs (1974) and as the beleaguered governor of the planet Varos in Vengeance on Varos (1985). He became a familiar face on television when he played Jon in the BBC's landmark 1967 adaptation of The Forsyte Saga, the title role in a BBC serial of Nicholas Nickleby (1968), The Rivals of Sherlock Holmes (1970) and Uriah Heep in the 1974 BBC version of David Copperfield, and when he was the male lead in the sitcom Rings on Their Fingers (1978–80) with Diane Keen. In 1993, he starred with Ewan McGregor and Rachel Weisz in a BBC adaptation of Scarlet and Black. He also appeared in the 2002 BBC children's miniseries Bootleg.

He has appeared as a guest on 161 episodes of Channel 4's Countdown between 1990 and 2008.

His appearances on American television include such series as Murder, She Wrote, Walker, Texas Ranger, and more recently Stargate Atlantis and Numb3rs.

Jarvis was the subject of BBC television's This Is Your Life in 1999.

He appeared in ITV 1's The Bill in July 2008. In March 2010, it was announced that he would appear in the BBC soap opera EastEnders playing journalist Harvey Freeman.

Jarvis appeared in a 2014 episode of Law & Order: UK as Eric Chandler, a man arrested and charged with murder. In September 2022, Jarvis appeared alongside his wife in an episode of the BBC soap opera Doctors as John Chilton.

Voice work
Among his work, Jarvis did the voiceovers for the 2010 BBC series Just William and voices the animal characters, as well as Voltaire the wise Weather-Cock, in the 1994 children's television series Fourways Farm. He has also voiced various characters in animated series such as The Grim Adventures of Billy & Mandy and The Life and Times of Juniper Lee. In the former, he inherited the role of the character Nergal from his Titanic co-star David Warner. In 2000, Jarvis voiced John Dread in the TV series Max Steel. He has also voiced all the characters in the children's stop-motion animated series Huxley Pig and narrated "The Tempest" in Shakespeare: The Animated Tales.

Jarvis has also undertaken audiobooks of P. G. Wodehouse's works, and won the Audie Award for these. He is the narrator of the 2011 audiobook of The Selfish Giant by Oscar Wilde. Further work in 2011 includes an audiobook of the Wilbur Smith novel The Leopard Hunts in Darkness. He has also appeared in Jubilee, a Doctor Who spin-off audio drama by Big Finish Productions, alongside his wife. In film, Jarvis appeared in Disney's 2012 film Wreck-It Ralph as Saitine, one of the video game villains who attends the Bad Anon self-help groups with Ralph (John C. Reilly).

Jarvis has also performed voiceovers for video games, beginning in 2007 as the role of The Chronicler in the Spyro the Dragon video game series. He also provided the voice of Admiral Zaal'Koris vas Qwib Qwib in Mass Effect 2 (2010) and Mass Effect 3 (2012). Also in 2011, Jarvis also performed a voice-over part for the MMORPG Star Wars: The Old Republic. Jarvis also voiced Alfred Pennyworth in the Batman: Arkham series of video games. He first voiced the character in the 2011 video game Batman: Arkham City and would reprise for the 2013 video game Batman: Arkham Origins and the 2014 DC Universe animated movie Batman: Assault on Arkham, and the 2015 video game Batman: Arkham Knight.

He read Charles Dickens' A Tale of Two Cities for the Chivers Audio Books production on cassette, later released on CD by Barnes & Noble Audio Classics.

Personal life
Jarvis married Rosalind Ayres on 23 November 1974 in Ealing; he has two sons by a previous marriage. He met Ayres when they played in Hamlet together; she played Ophelia. Together with his wife, Jarvis runs the radio production company "Jarvis & Ayres Productions", frequently used by BBC Radio 4.

He was awarded the OBE in 2000. He has also published a book of memoirs titled Acting Strangely: A Funny Kind of Life ( hardback,  paperback). Jarvis has homes in West Hollywood and London.

Filmography

Film

Television

Doctor Who The Web Planet (1965)
The Forsyte Saga (1967) 
Jackanory (1967) 
 The Moonstone (1972)
The Pallisers (1974)
Doctor Who Invasion of the Dinosaurs (1974) 
Rings on Their Fingers (1978)
Ike (Miniseries: Part II) (1979) – George VI
Breakaway (1980)
Mr Palfrey of Westminster (1984)
The Black Tower (1985)
Doctor Who Vengeance on Varos (1985)
The Reluctant Dragon (1987)
Huxley Pig (1989–1990) (voice)
Rumpole of the Bailey (Episode: "Rumpole and the Age of Miracles") (1988)
The Fool of the World and the Flying Ship (1990) (voice)
Inspector Morse (Episode: "Greeks Bearing Gifts") (1991)
Shakespeare: The Animated Tales (1992) (voice)
Lovejoy (1994)
Fourways Farm (1994) (narrator, voice)
The Queen's Nose (1995)
Testament: The Bible in Animation (1996)
Space: Above and Beyond (1996)
A Touch of Frost (1996)
Extreme Ghostbusters (1997) (voice)
Space Island One (Episode: "Mayfly") (1998) – Prof. Jarvis
Jackie Chan Adventures (2000) (voice)
The Inspector Lynley Mysteries (Episode: "Well Schooled in Murder") (2002)
Muffin The Mule (audiobooks) (2005) - Narrator
NUMB3RS (2007) – Taylor Ashby
EastEnders (2010)
Endeavour (2013) – Henry Broom
By Any Means (2013)
Dead Man's Folly (2013)

Video games

References

External links
 
 Guardian Q & A September 2007
 The Times May 2004
 The Actor's Compendium

1941 births
Living people
Alumni of RADA
Audiobook narrators
English male film actors
English male stage actors
English male television actors
English male voice actors
Male actors from Gloucestershire
Officers of the Order of the British Empire
People educated at Whitgift School
People from Cheltenham
People from South Norwood
Theatre World Award winners
20th-century English male actors
21st-century English male actors